The Widow and the Only Man is a 1904 American short silent comedy film produced by the American Mutoscope & Biograph Company and directed by Wallace McCutcheon, Sr.

Plot
A group of women sitting on the veranda of a resort hotel. First the woman arrives, and later the man. The film then shows their friendship progressing as they dine together, ride in a carriage together, and boat together. When they are boating, the boat turns over, and the man rescues the widow. A later scene shows a box of flowers being delivered to the widow, and the camera moves in to a close-up of the woman as she admires each flower and back out to show the arrival of her suitor. The denouement takes place later in a dry goods store. The widow walks in and promptly faints when she discovers that the ribbon  clerk is none other than her gallant summer beau.

Production and distribution
The film was filmed on location in Brooklyn, and Coney Island on 9 and 11 August 1904. It was released on 8 September 1904. It was produced and distributed by the American Mutoscope & Biograph Company.

Analysis

The film is composed of  12 shots and four intertitles. The two first intertitles introduce the protagonists as The Only Man and The Widow, and are followed by two medium close-ups. The two other intertitles divide the film in two parts: The Episode, composed of 9 shots and Back to the Ribbon counter which includes only one shot. All these shots are wide shots, some with camera panning, with the exception of shot 8 showing a close-up of the widow "as she inspects some flowers sent to her by the hero".

The Episode

1. A Group of women sitting down on a veranda and talking excitedly. One looks in a pair of binoculars and gesticulate excitedly. A man arrives and a hotel clerk takes his luggage and they both come in.

2. Other angle showing the veranda. A motor car arrives, bringing three women.

3. Another view of the veranda. The man is playing the banjo surrounded by all the women. The widow enters and sits down

4. Same view as 2. A woman and her daughter leave on a carriage,  followed by the man and the widow in another carriage.

5. Other view of the veranda. The man and the widow are sitting alone. He kisses her.

6. The beach. A maid takes off the shoes and the bathrobe of the lady next to a rowing boat. The man pulls the boat afloat and they row away. The camera pans to follow them. The boat capsizes. The man swims ashore with the lady.

7. The widow's bedroom. The maid brings a box of flowers to the widow sitting in an easy chair. 

8. Medium close-up of the lady. She kisses the flowers.

9. Same shot as 7. The maid introduces the man. He sits next to the woman. They flirt.

Back to the ribbon counter

1. A shop. Two women come in, examine various goods, leave. The widow comes in and faints when she discovers that the ribbon clerck is  her gallant summer beau.

The film has been mentioned as an example of the regular "feature productions" produced by Biograph from the summer of 1904, which allowed this company to overtake the Edison Company as "America's foremost motion picture producer". It has also been stressed that his is one of the first example where a scene filmed as a wide shot is interrupted by a close-up of the protagonist.

References

External links

 The Widow and the Only Man (1904) at A Cinema History

1904 films
American silent short films
American black-and-white films
Silent American comedy films
1904 comedy films
Films directed by Wallace McCutcheon Sr.
1900s American films